is a Japanese manga artist. Her works have been published in Yuri Shimai, Comic Yuri Hime, Comic Hot Milk, and other yuri and adult manga magazines. She made her professional debut as an illustrator for Cobalt Bunko, a shōjo novel imprint from Shueisha. 


Works

Games
 (PC-98/Windows, original design work)

References

External links
 

Japanese female comics artists
Female comics writers
Japanese women writers
Living people
Women manga artists
Manga artists from Tokyo
People from Tokyo
Year of birth missing (living people)